The Elisabeth Bay Formation, alternatively spelled as Elizabeth Bay Formation, is an Early Miocene (Aquitanian to Burdigalian, around 21 Ma) geologic formation in the Sperrgebiet, ǁKaras Region of southwestern Namibia, overlying the Blaubok Conglomerate. The freshwater green and red siltstones, sandstones, intercalations of conglomerates and claystones of the formation were deposited in a fluvial environment, infilling a paleovalley incised during the Oligocene low sea stand, which backfilled during the Burdigalian marine transgression. The Elisabeth Bay Formation provides many fossil mammals, snakes and other reptiles.

Fossil content 
The following fossils are reported from the formation:

Mammals

 Afrosmilus africanus
 Apodecter stromeri
 Bathyergoides neotertiarius
 Diamantomys luederitzi
 Leptoplesictis senutae
 Metapterodon kaiseri
 Miohyrax oswaldi
 Namasector soriae
 Parapedetes namaquensis
 Promicrogale namibiensis
 Isohyaenodon sp.
 Ysengrinia sp.	
 Viverridae indet.

Reptiles

 cf. Python
 Amphisbaenia indet.
 Boidae indet.
 Colubridae indet.
 Colubroidea indet.
 Gekkonidae indet.
 Lacertilia indet.
 Viperidae indet.

See also 

 List of fossiliferous stratigraphic units in Namibia
 Geology of Namibia
 Penguin Islands

References

Bibliography

Further reading 
 J.-C. Rage. 2008. Squamate reptiles from the Lower Miocene of the Sperrgebiet, Namibia. In M. Pickford and B. Senut (eds.), Geology and palaeobiology of the northern Sperrgebiet, Namibia. Memoir of the Geological Survey of Namibia (Ministry of Mines and Energy, Windhoek) 20:93-103

Geologic formations of Namibia
Miocene Africa
Aquitanian (stage)
Burdigalian
Siltstone formations
Sandstone formations
Shale formations
Conglomerate formations
Fluvial deposits
Paleontology in Namibia
Geography of ǁKaras Region